The 1881 Southern Maori by-election was a by-election held on 1 March 1881 in the  electorate during the 7th New Zealand Parliament.

The by-election was caused by the resignation of the incumbent MP Ihaia Tainui.

The by-election was won by Hōri Kerei Taiaroa; he had been disqualified from the Legislative Council and Tainui had resigned so that he could return to the Lower House.

There was no vote as Taiaroa was unopposed.

References 

Southern Maori 1881
1881 elections in New Zealand
Māori politics